The Northern Liberator was a radical English newspaper. It was published between 21 October 1837 and 19 December 1840 from Newcastle upon Tyne.

References

Defunct newspapers published in the United Kingdom
Publications established in 1837
Publications disestablished in 1840
1837 establishments in England